David Giubilato (born 13 September 1976) is a retired Italian football defender.

References

External links
 Player Profile at Gazzetta dello Sport website

1976 births
Living people
Italian footballers
Italy youth international footballers
A.C. Perugia Calcio players
S.S. Fidelis Andria 1928 players
Bologna F.C. 1909 players
L.R. Vicenza players
Mantova 1911 players
Venezia F.C. players
A.C.N. Siena 1904 players
S.S.C. Napoli players
A.S. Sambenedettese players
Catania S.S.D. players
Frosinone Calcio players
Ternana Calcio players
Avezzano Calcio players
Serie A players
Serie B players
Serie C players
Association football defenders